A savior baby or savior sibling is a child who is conceived in order to provide a stem cell transplant to a sibling that is affected with a fatal disease, such as cancer or Fanconi anemia, that can best be treated by hematopoietic stem cell transplantation.

The savior sibling is conceived through in vitro fertilization. Fertilized zygotes are tested for genetic compatibility (human leukocyte antigen (HLA) typing), using preimplantation genetic diagnosis (PGD), and only zygotes that are compatible with the existing child are implanted. Zygotes are also tested to make sure they are free of the original genetic disease. The procedure is controversial.

Indications
A savior sibling may be the solution for any disease treated by hematopoietic stem cell transplantation. It is effective against genetically detectable (mostly monogenic) diseases, e.g. Fanconi anemia, Diamond–Blackfan anemia and β-thalassemia, in the ailing sibling, since the savior sibling can be selected to not have inherited the disease. The procedure may also be used in children with leukemia, and in such cases HLA match is the only requirement, and not exclusion of any other obvious genetic disorder.

Procedure

Multiple embryos are created and preimplantation genetic diagnosis is used to detect and select ones that are free of a genetic disorder and that are also a HLA match for an existing sibling who requires a transplant. Upon birth, umbilical cord blood is taken and used for hematopoietic stem cell transplantation.

Laws
 In the United Kingdom, the Human Fertilisation and Embryology Authority (HFEA) has ruled that it is lawful to use modern reproductive techniques to create a savior sibling.
In Victoria, Australia, use of PGD for HLA typing is reviewed by the Infertility Treatment Authority on a case-by-case basis.

Ethical considerations
Arguments for or against the use of PGD/HLA tissue typing are based on several key issues including the commodification and welfare of the donor child.

The main ethical argument against is the possible exploitation of the child, e.g. potential adverse psychological effects on a child born not for itself but to save another, and the possible future emotional reaction of the savior sibling upon discovering that they were born solely to save the life of the recipient, rather than being 'wanted' for reasons other than transplantation.

A survey of 4,000 Americans showed that 61% approved of PGD use for savior siblings.

History
Yury Verlinsky and collaborators described the first case in 2001.

Popular culture
The novel My Sister's Keeper, later adapted into a film, is about a child who was born as a savior sibling to her sister Kate who is affected by acute promyelocytic leukemia.

In the British soap opera Emmerdale, Debbie Dingle gave birth to her son Jack, who would serve as a savior sibling to his older sister Sarah, who was suffering from Fanconi anemia.

On the popular American show CSI: Crime Scene Investigation, the episode "Harvest" deals with the reported abduction and later murder of a thirteen-year-old girl named Alycia who was later revealed to be a savior sibling for her brother Daniel.

In the American show Heroes, one of the protagonists, Mohinder Suresh, is revealed to have been conceived to cure his sister Shanti of a deadly disease known as the Shanti Virus, although he was ultimately born too late to save her life. His antibodies act as a cure for other patients with the disease throughout the show as well.

On Star Trek: Enterprise, the episode "Similitude" sees a clone created of Trip Tucker for the purpose of organ harvesting. "Sim" is born through the highly controversial use of an alien lifeform.

The novel Never Let Me Go, later adapted into a film, is centred around a dystopian future society where human clones are created and allowed to live to their teenage years before being used for organ harvesting.  The film Parts: The Clonus Horror has a similar premise.

In the Grey's Anatomy episode "I Bet It Stung," the character Donna is a savior sibling to her older sister Reese.

In the 9-1-1 episode "Buck Begins", it is revealed that Evan "Buck" Buckley was conceived as a savior sibling for his older brother Daniel.

In the Korean Drama 'The Penthouse', the character Anna is adopted by a Korean-American family to be a savior sibling to their son, Logan Lee, who was suffering from bone marrow cancer at the time.

References

External links
 "Made to Order Savior" New York Times Magazine
 £Select a Baby’s Health, Not Eye Color" Los Angeles Times Op-ed

Ethically disputed medical practices
Medical genetics
Sibling